Dean Hewitt (born 9 November 1994) is an Australian curler from Melbourne.

At the 2021 Olympic Curling Qualification Event in December 2021 Hewitt and his teammate Tahli Gill made history, when they won qualification to the mixed doubles tournament at the 2022 Winter Olympics. They are the first ever Australian curling team (in any curling discipline) to qualify for the Winter Olympics.

Personal life
Hewitt is from a curling family. His mother, Canadian-born Lynn Hewitt, played curling in Canada from her childhood. When she met Australian farmer Stephen (Steve) Hewitt, she married him and they moved to Australia, and her husband began curling too. He was member of the Australian national men's team and played in several Pacific Curling Championships. Dean Hewitt began curling when he was 6 years old. Lynn and Dean together played as the Australian national mixed doubles curling team at the 2017 World Mixed Doubles Curling Championship and the 2018 World Mixed Doubles Curling Championship

Hewitt studied a Bachelor of Exercise and Sport Science and a Master of Clinical Exercise Physiology at Deakin University. Outside of curling, Hewitt is a trained exercise physiologist, and works at an ice rink and a supermarket.

Teams and events

Men's

Mixed doubles

References

External links
 

Living people
Australian male curlers
Australian curling champions
1994 births
Deakin University alumni
Australian people of Canadian descent
Sportspeople from Melbourne
Curlers at the 2022 Winter Olympics
Olympic curlers of Australia
Sportsmen from Victoria (Australia)